Teofil Codreanu (1 February 1941 – 10 January 2016) was a Romanian footballer who played as an attacking midfielder.

Club career
Teofil Codreanu, nicknamed Parpală was born on 1 February 1941 in Bucharest, Romania and started to play football in 1956 at junior level at CCA București. In 1959 he went to play for Rapid București where on 18 March 1962 he made his Divizia A debut under coach Ion Mihăilescu in a 1–1 against Minerul Lupeni. He spent all of his career at Rapid, which consisted of 12 seasons in which he helped the club win the 1966–67 Divizia A which was the first title in the club's history, being used by coach Valentin Stănescu in 23 matches in which he scored two goals. He also won the 1971–72 Cupa României, playing four games in the campaign, including the final. Codreanu played 14 games and scored 3 goals in European competitions, taking part in the 1967–68 European Cup campaign in which he helped Rapid eliminate Trakia Plovdiv by scoring two goals in the second leg, being eliminated by Juventus in the following round, also playing 5 games in the 1971–72 UEFA Cup campaign as the team reached the eight-finals, eliminating Napoli and Legia Warsaw, being eliminated by the team who would eventually win the competition, Tottenham and took part in the 1972–73 European Cup Winners' Cup campaign, playing two games, helping the team reach the quarter-finals, eliminating Landskrona BoIS and Rapid Wien, being eliminated by Leeds United who reached the final. He made his last Divizia A appearance on 20 June 1973 in a 2–1 away loss against SC Bacău, having a total of 258 appearances and 39 goals scored in the competition and 33 matches with 7 goals scored in Cupa României. Teofil Codreanu died on 10 January 2016 at age 74 in his native Bucharest.

International career
Teofil Codreanu made one appearance at international level for Romania, playing on 23 October 1965 under coach Ilie Oană in a 2–1 away loss against Turkey at the 1966 World Cup qualifiers.

Managerial career
Teofil Codreanu was also a manager who coached mostly in the Romanian lower leagues at Mecanică Fină București, Unirea Răcari, CSM Borzești and Metalul Rădăuți, having only a single Divizia A experience which consisted of 7 games at Rapid București, also coaching for many years at the team's center of children and juniors.

Honours
Rapid București
Divizia A: 1966–67
Cupa României: 1971–72

Notes

References

External links
 

1941 births
2016 deaths
Olympic footballers of Romania
Romania international footballers
Romanian footballers
Footballers from Bucharest
Liga I players
FC Rapid București players
Association football midfielders
Romanian football managers
FC Rapid București managers
FC Rapid București assistant managers